Rangiri Dambulla International Cricket Stadium is a 16,800 seat cricket stadium in Sri Lanka. It is situated in the Central Province, close to Dambulla on a 60-acre (240,000 m2) site leased from the Rangiri Dambulla Temple, is the first and only International cricket ground in dry zone of Sri Lanka. The stadium is built overlooking the Dambulla Tank (reservoir) and the Dambulla Rock.

History

The inaugural One Day International (ODI) match was played between Sri Lanka and England in March 2001.
Floodlights were installed in 2003.
This stadium hosted all the matches of the Asia Cup 2010, due to renovation of other grounds for the 2011 Cricket World Cup.
The stadium returned to international cricket in November 2013 after a three-year period due to its highly criticised floodlight system.
The stadium hosted only day matches from 2013 until late 2016.
In 2015, plans were undertaken to replace the outdated 8 floodlight towers with four LED ones.

The ground

Situated in the dry zone, the original rationale behind the project was that it provided Sri Lanka with the potential to host one-day matches throughout the year. Construction was funded by the Board of Control for Cricket in Sri Lanka (BCCSL) and championed by the then BCCSL President, Thilanga Sumathipala. Construction took only 167 days.  After construction and the inaugural match it sat idle due to complications with the lease and the contractors. International cricket finally returned in May 2003, the venue staging all seven matches of the tournament because of monsoon rains in the south.

The pitch is bowler friendly. Seamers benefit in the morning because of the high water table and heavy sweating.  Spinners benefit in the afternoon when the pitch can crumble.

The first day-night ODI was held on 28 August 2016, during the ODI series against Australia after upgrading floodlights to ICC Standards. This match was the final ODI for Sri Lankan great Tillakaratne Dilshan.

Ground figures

International matches

Key

 P: Matches played
 H: Matches won by home side
 T: Matches won by touring side
 N: Matches won by neutral side
D/N/T: Matches drawn/no result/tied

Updated 13 October 2018

One Day International
The highest ODI total at the Rangiri Dambulla International Stadium is 385/7 by Pakistan against Bangladesh on June 21, 2010.
The lowest ODI total is 88 by England against Sri Lanka on November 18, 2003, and by India against New Zealand on August 10, 2010.
Mahela Jayawardene has scored 1148 runs and is the highest by a single player at the Rangiri Dambulla International Stadium.
The highest individual score at stadium is 132 not out by Shikhar Dhawan against Sri Lanka in 2017.
India legend Sourav Ganguly scored his 10000th ODI run on this ground in 2005.
Muttiah Muralitharan with 42 scalps has captured the most number of wickets at the Rangiri Dambulla International Stadium.
The best bowling figures recorded at the stadium is 6/42 by John Hastings.
Farveez Maharoof (Sri Lanka) and Taskin Ahmed (Bangladesh) have both taken hat-tricks at the Rangiri Dambulla International Stadium.
The 50th ODI at the ground was held on 28 March 2017, between Sri Lanka and Bangladesh, which was washed out by the rain and ended in no result. The match was also the 200th ODI for Sri Lankan opener Upul Tharanga as well.
On 20 August 2017, Lasith Malinga played his 200th ODI match for Sri Lanka against India.

See also
 List of Test cricket grounds
 List of international cricket grounds in Sri Lanka

References

External links
 Upcoming matches at Dambulla
 Cricinfo profile on Dambulla

Cricket grounds in Sri Lanka
Sports venues in Central Province, Sri Lanka
2000 establishments in Sri Lanka
Cricket in Dambulla